The 2019 Dunlop Touring Car Trophy is the inaugural season of the Touring Car Trophy. The championship features production-based touring cars built to either NGTC, TCR or Super 2000 specifications and will compete in ten races across five meetings across England. The championship is aimed as a feeder category to the BTCC and operated by Stewart Lines' Maximum Group. On April 5, it was announced that TCR UK had merged into the series and will be represented by the TCR class.

Teams and drivers

The following teams and drivers are currently entered.

Race calendar and results

The following meetings are as scheduled.

Championship standings

A driver's best 4 rounds counted towards the championship, with any other points being discarded.

Drivers' Standings

Teams' championship

References

External links
 

Touring Car Trophy
Touring Car Trophy